Argopleura is a genus of characins endemic to Colombia.

Species
There are currently 4 recognized species in this genus:

 Argopleura chocoensis (C. H. Eigenmann, 1913)
 Argopleura conventus (C. H. Eigenmann, 1913)
 Argopleura diquensis (C. H. Eigenmann, 1913)
 Argopleura magdalenensis (C. H. Eigenmann, 1913)

References

Characidae
Endemic fauna of Colombia
Freshwater fish of Colombia